Semyon Bychkov may refer to:
Semyon Bychkov (conductor) (born 1952), Russian-American conductor
Semyon Trofimovich Bychkov (1918–1946), Soviet pilot